The women's 100 metres at the 2014 World Junior Championships in Athletics was held at Hayward Field on 22 and 23 July.

Medalists

Records

Results

Heats
Qualification: The first 3 of each heat (Q) and the 3 fastest times (q) qualified

 Tenorio was originally disqualified for a false start, but was reinstated and allowed to effectively run a solo time trial. As her time would have been sufficient to merit a non-automatic qualifying spot, an extra slot was created to ensure Abreu, the slowest of the existing 'non-automatic' qualifiers did not lose out.

Semifinals
Qualification: The first 2 of each heat (Q) and the 2 fastest times (q) qualified

Final
Wind: -1.0 m/s

References

External links
 100 metres schedule

100 metres
100 metres at the World Athletics U20 Championships
2014 in women's athletics